Let's Go Crazy is a 1951 short comedy film marking an early appearance of Spike Milligan and Peter Sellers playing multiple roles. In one memorable scene Sellers imitates Groucho Marx.

Cast
Peter Sellers - Groucho Marx / Giuseppe / Cedric / Crystal Jollibottom / Izzy Gozunk
Spike Milligan - Eccles, Waiter
Wallas Eaton - Mr Jollibottom
Tommy Manley - Variety Act
Florence Austin - Variety Act
Freddie Mirfield and his Garbage Men - Variety Act
Keith Warwick - Vocalist

Critical reception
Kine Weekly wrote, "the performers are versatile and willing, but presentation lacks imagination and showmanship."

References

External links

1951 films
1951 comedy films
British comedy films
British short films
Cultural depictions of the Marx Brothers
British black-and-white films
1950s English-language films
1950s British films